James Lewis (born 1601) was a Welsh politician who sat in the House of Commons  at various times between 1624 and 1656. He supported the Royalist and then the Parliamentary side in the English Civil War.

Lewis was the son of Sir John Lewis of Abaernant-bychen and his wife Bridget Pryse, daughter of Sir Richard Pryse. He matriculated at Jesus College, Oxford on 14 March 1617, aged 15. In 1624, Lewis was elected Member of Parliament for Cardiganshire in the Short Parliament. He was re-elected MP for Cardiganshire in 1625, 1626 and 1628 and sat until 1629 when King Charles decided to rule without parliament for eleven years.

Lewis was re-elected MP for Cardiganshire in April 1640 for the Short Parliament.  He was a Royalist at the beginning of the Civil War, but in January 1645 was appointed one of the sequestration committee for Cardigan, Pembroke and Carmarthen Counties. He was Colonel in a regiment of the parliamentary army and captured Newcastle Emlyn for parliament in December 1645. His regiment was ordered to be disbanded in March 1648 though it was retained a little longer.

Information was laid against him on 12 February 1649 that he had fought originally for the king, had protected Royalists when on the sequestration committee and his regiment had cost the state £50,000. An order was made for his discharge on 15 March 1649 under the general act of pardon for South Wales.

He was re-elected MP for Cardiganshire in 1656 for the Second Protectorate Parliament.

After the Restoration he was nominated for the honour of Knight of the Royal Oak. He was High Sheriff of Cardiganshire in 1664. He was described as "a person of inoffensive, facile constitution, forced from a Royalist to act as a colonel for King and Parliament: seldom out of publique offices, though averse to undertake any; loved more for doing no wrong, than for doing of any good".

References

 

 

1601 births
Year of death missing
Members of the Parliament of England (pre-1707) for constituencies in Wales
High Sheriffs of Cardiganshire
17th-century Welsh politicians
Cavaliers
Alumni of Jesus College, Oxford
Roundheads
English MPs 1624–1625
English MPs 1625
English MPs 1626
English MPs 1628–1629
English MPs 1640 (April)
English MPs 1656–1658